Arabic language schools are language schools specialized in teaching Arabic as a foreign language. There are different types of Arabic language schools  based on their focused branch, target audience, methods of instruction delivery, cultural atmosphere, and elective courses available.

Definition and scope
Unlike general language schools that provide Arabic classes and certificates along with other live languages' classes as well, Arabic language schools are those that specialize in Arabic language instruction only, or mainly. Al Diwan Center and the Moroccan Center for Arabic Studies MCAS are examples, whose focus is on Arabic only. Examples of those schools that cannot be referred to as an "Arabic language school" are the British Council, the CFCC, the AMIDEAST, and other cultural exchange bodies in Arab countries.
While not very big in number, those specialized schools with this focus made them very effective in teaching this subject matter that are regarded by many as difficult compared to other live languages of today. Provided that most of them are located where Arabic is the native mother tongue, they make it ideal for those who want to practice what they learn in a daily life experience
.

Categories
Schools that teach Arabic to speakers of other languages are categorized based on the following:

Size and levels provided
Some schools are large enough to provide graduate-like course curriculum and teaching quality, while others are starting out and provide middle-to-high school level of Arabic teaching.

Profitability

 Business and for-profit Arabic language schools
 Most Arabic language schools fall under this category
 Charitable non-profit Arabic language schools
 Mostly Islamic religious organizations

Specialty

 MSA only.
 Dialect only.
 Mix of MSA and Dialect.

Many schools provide side courses on related subjects like: Islamic religious courses related to language like Quranic recitation, and Arabic calligraphy.

Arabic language schools

 Aldiwan Arabic Language Center
 Episcopal Training Center, Cairo

See also

 ʾIʿrab
 Arabic literature
 Arabic alphabet
 Arabic calligraphy
 List of Islamic terms in Arabic
 Language education
 Second language acquisition
 Applied linguistics

References

Language schools